Nathan Lukes (born July 12, 1994) is an American professional baseball outfielder in the Toronto Blue Jays organization.

High school and college
Lukes grew up in Antelope, California and attended Center High School.. He enrolled at California State University, Sacramento and played college baseball for the Sacramento State Hornets for three seasons. He was named All-Western Athletic Conference (WAC) after hitting .347 with 26 RBIs and 54 runs scored in his sophomore season. After the season, Lukes played collegiate summer baseball for the Victoria HarbourCats in the West Coast League. He repeated as a first team All-WAC selection as a junior after batting for a .345 average with 81 total hits, seven home runs, 38 RBIs, and 13 stolen bases. Lukes finished his collegiate career as Sacramento State's all-time hit leader with 244.

Professional career

Cleveland Indians
The Cleveland Indians selected Lukes in the seventh round of the 2015 Major League Baseball draft. After signing with the team he was assigned to the Mahoning Valley Scrappers, where he played in five games before missing the rest of the season after breaking his right hand. He began the 2016 season with the Class A Lake County Captains before being promoted to the Class A-Advanced Lynchburg Hillcats.

Tampa Bay Rays
The Indians included Lukes in a trade with the Tampa Bay Rays for Brandon Guyer on August 1, 2016. Lukes started the 2017 season in Charlotte before being promoted to the Double-A Montgomery Biscuits after six games and spent the 2018 with the team as well. Lukes played for the Triple-A Durham Bulls in 2019, where he batted .219 with eight doubles, four home runs and 31 RBIs in 91 games. He did not play a minor league game in 2020 since the season was cancelled due to the COVID-19 pandemic. Lukes was named to the Rays' 2021 Spring Training roster as a non-roster invitee.

Toronto Blue Jays
On November 29, 2021, Lukes signed a minor league contract with the Toronto Blue Jays and was invited to spring training. He was added to the 40-man roster after the 2022 season.

References

External links
Sacramento State Hornets bio

Living people
1994 births
Baseball players from Oregon
Baseball outfielders
Minor league baseball players
Mahoning Valley Scrappers players
Lake County Captains players
Charlotte Stone Crabs players
Lynchburg Hillcats players
Montgomery Biscuits players
Durham Bulls players
Sacramento State Hornets baseball players
Buffalo Bisons (minor league) players